Positive is an album by the American band the Grassy Knoll, released in 1996.

The band promoted the album by touring with 16volt.

Production
Recorded in San Antonio and San Francisco, the album was produced by Bob Green and Jaime Lagueruela. In assembling the band, frontman Green was more concerned with finding musicians who could follow conceptual, not technical, direction. Green would have the musicians record their parts, and would then edit, manipulate, and remix the tracks with Lagueruela; Green also played keyboards, guitar, and bass.

Critical reception

The Orlando Sentinel wrote that "like the best ambient music, it works both in the background and as the object of intense attention ... But even in the background, the Grassy Knoll is not exactly quiet and soothing." Guitar Player stated: "Replete with hypnotic grooves and outer-fringe guitar loops, Positive ... abounds with compelling sonic tapestries." The Chicago Tribune determined that the band "swaddles hip-hop rhythms in a Technicolor dreamcoat of cool jazz, metal ax riffs, ambient sound and tape mangling."

The Los Angeles Times thought that "titles like 'Black Helicopters', 'Roswell Crash' and 'Fall of the American Empire' seem to be all of one mood, with only the occasional trumpet solo emerging from the hypnotic beats." The Times Colonist noted that "Milesian trumpet floats like a spooky echo above Zeppelin-inspired guitar and a textural framework that marries Public Enemy's apocalyptic noise to Tricky's spaced-out, transcendent grooves." The Oregonian praised the "well-crafted album full of samples and darkly ethereal funk-rock overtones."

AllMusic wrote: "Time and changes in sampling/hip-hop aesthetics rendered the Grassy Knoll's work less cutting-edge and more representative of a phase but, for all that, Positive succeeds as an enjoyable if slightly stiff exploration of jazz-meets-breakbeat culture."

Track listing

References

1996 albums
Antilles Records albums